The 2018 Utah State Aggies football team represented Utah State University in the 2018 NCAA Division I FBS football season. The Aggies were led by sixth-year head coach Matt Wells during the regular season and played their home games at Merlin Olsen Field at Maverik Stadium. They competed as members of the Mountain Division of the Mountain West Conference. They finished the season 11–2, 7–1 in Mountain West play to finish in a tie for first place in the division with Boise State. Despite the tie, the conference does not credit them as divisional co-champions as a result of the head-to-head loss. They were invited to the New Mexico Bowl where they defeated North Texas. The 11 wins tied a school record.

Head coach Matt Wells was hired by Texas Tech on November 29; the team was led in the New Mexico Bowl by interim head coach and co-defensive
coordinator Frank Maile. Wells finished with a 44–34 record in his six seasons at Utah State. On December 9, the school rehired Gary Andersen, six years after he left for Wisconsin.

Previous season
The Aggies finished the 2017 season 6–7, 4–4 in Mountain West play to finish in a tie for fourth place in the Mountain Division. They were invited to the Arizona Bowl where they lost to New Mexico State.

Preseason

Award watch lists
Listed in the order that they were released

Mountain West media days
During the Mountain West media days held July 24–25 at the Cosmopolitan on the Las Vegas Strip, the Aggies were predicted to finish in fourth place in the Mountain Division.

Media poll

Preseason All-Mountain West Team
The Aggies had two players selected to the preseason all-Mountain West team.

Offense

Dax Raymond – TE

Specialists

Dominik Eberle – K

Schedule

Source: Mountain west championship

Game summaries

at Michigan State

New Mexico State

Tennessee Tech

Air Force

at BYU

UNLV

at Wyoming

New Mexico

at Hawaii

San Jose State

at Colorado State

at Boise State

vs. North Texas–New Mexico Bowl

Rankings

Players drafted into the NFL

References

Utah State
Utah State Aggies football seasons
New Mexico Bowl champion seasons
Utah State Aggies football